Radishchev is an urban locality (an urban-type settlement) in Irkutsk Oblast, Russia.

Radishchev may also refer to:

 Alexander Radishchev (1749-1802), Russian author and social critic

See also
Radishchevo, several inhabited localities in Russia